Atul Kumar is a synthetic organic chemist, Professor & Chief Scientist  at Academy of Scientific and Innovative Research (AcSIR) and Chairperson Medicinal and Process Chemistry Division  Central Drug Research Institute (CSIR-CDRI) at Lucknow, India and a Dean at National Institute of Pharmaceutical Education and Research, Raebareli.

Academic work
Kumar has about 24 years experience in drug design, medicinal chemistry and Green Chemistry

Dr.Kumar's major contributions are invention of Anti-osteoporosis Drug candidate CDRI-99/373 (CENTHANK), which is an currently in phase 1 clinical trial and NCE Anti-cancer Compound CDRI-S-007-1235 is currently in Pre-clinical stage.

References

External links
 Official website at CDRI

Year of birth missing (living people)
Living people
Council of Scientific and Industrial Research
Indian organic chemists
20th-century Indian chemists